In Greek mythology, Theano (/θiˈænoʊ/; Ancient Greek: Θεανώ) was the priestess of Athena in Troy.

Family 
Theano was the daughter of the Thracian king Cisseus and Telecleia and thus the sister of Queen Hecuba, wife of King Priam of Troy. She was the wife of Antenor and by him, mother of many sons possibly including, Archelochus, Acamas, Glaucus, Helicaon, Laodocus, Polybus, Agenor, Iphidamas, Coon, Laodamas, Demoleon, Eurymachus and Medon; and a daughter Crino.

Mythology 
The household of Antenor and Theano advocated peace and advised Helen's return to the Greeks. Because of their support (some say treason), the Greeks spared their household when they sacked the city. One story has Theano and Antenor sailing with Aeneas to Italy and founding the city of Padua. Another story is that she took the Palladium, an image of Athena that had fallen from the sky and supposedly provided Troy its protection, with her. In Book VI of the Iliad, with Hecuba and the Trojan women, Theano offered a gift and plea to Athena for the life of the city, but was rebuffed.

Notes

References 

 Dictys Cretensis, from The Trojan War. The Chronicles of Dictys of Crete and Dares the Phrygian translated by Richard McIlwaine Frazer, Jr. (1931-). Indiana University Press. 1966. Online version at the Topos Text Project.
 Homer, The Iliad with an English Translation by A.T. Murray, Ph.D. in two volumes. Cambridge, MA., Harvard University Press; London, William Heinemann, Ltd. 1924. Online version at the Perseus Digital Library.
 Homer, Homeri Opera in five volumes. Oxford, Oxford University Press. 1920. Greek text available at the Perseus Digital Library.
 Maurus Servius Honoratus, In Vergilii carmina comentarii. Servii Grammatici qui feruntur in Vergilii carmina commentarii; recensuerunt Georgius Thilo et Hermannus Hagen. Georgius Thilo. Leipzig. B. G. Teubner. 1881. Online version at the Perseus Digital Library.
 Pausanias, Description of Greece with an English Translation by W.H.S. Jones, Litt.D., and H.A. Ormerod, M.A., in 4 Volumes. Cambridge, MA, Harvard University Press; London, William Heinemann Ltd. 1918. Online version at the Perseus Digital Library
 Pausanias, Graeciae Descriptio. 3 vols. Leipzig, Teubner. 1903.  Greek text available at the Perseus Digital Library.

Princesses in Greek mythology
Trojans